The Reumert Award (Danish: Årets Reumert) is an annual Danish awards ceremony to recognize excellence in theatre achievements in Denmark. There are 16 award categories as well as 10 talent awards. A jury of ten specialists in theatre selects the recipients, who receive a statuette and a prize. As of 2016, the recipients also receive an amount of money. The recipients of the Reumert Award of Honour receive DKK 200,000, the recipients of the Talent Prize receive DKK 35,000 and all other categories-recipients receive DKK 40,000. The Reumert prize is named after the Danish actor Poul Reumert (1883–1968).

Categories 
 Award of Honour (previously Bikuben Award of Honour)
 Best Performance
 Best Actress
 Best Actor
 Best Supporting Actress
 Best Supporting Actor
 Best Dancer
 Best Director
 Best Scenographer
 Best Dramatist
 Best Children Theatre Performance
 Best Opera
 Best Musical
 Best Dance Performance
 Best Special Performance
 10 Talent Awards for young performers

Recipients

Reumert Award of Honour 
From 1998–2013 the award was called the Bikuben Award of Honour. Since 2014 it is called the Award of Honour (Årets hæderspris).
 1998 Bodil Udsen, actor
 1999 Lisbeth Balslev, opera singer
 2000 Jørgen Reenberg, actor
 2001 , dramatist, director, actor, and theatre manager
 2002 Nikolaj Hübbe, royal ballet dancer
 2003 Ghita Nørby, actor
 2004 , actor
 2005 Preben Kristensen, actor
 2006 Thomas Lund, dancer
 2007 Stig Fogh Andersen, royal opera singer
 2008 Kirsten Olesen, actor
 2009 Silja Schandorff, dancer
 2010 Jytte Abildstrøm, actor and theatre manager
 2011 Lars Mikkelsen, actor
 2012 Tim Rushton, choreograph and the leader of Dansk Danseteater
 2013 , director
 2014 , actor
 2015 Kirsten Dehlholm, theatre leader and director
 2016 Lisbet Dahl, actor and director

Reumert Special Award 
The name of this award was Reumert Special Award (Årets Reumert Særpris) in 2000 and 2002, and again since 2014. In 2012–13 it was called the Reumert Jury Award.
 2000 Preben Harris, actor and director
 2002 Jacob Schokking, director
 2012 "BLAM!" with Neander Teater
 2013 "Manifest 2083", CaféTeatret
 2014 "Boys Don't Cry", Mungo Park and Eventministeriet, Det Kongelige Teater
 2015 "Ungdom", Republique
 2016 "Hår på den", Teater Grob and Frit Fald

Reumert for Best Performance 
 1999 "Personkreds 3", Betty Nansen Teatret/Edison
 2000 "Sælsomt Mellemspil", Det Kgl. Teater
 2001 "Hamlet", Aalborg Teater
 2002 "Når vi døde vågner", Betty Nansen Teatret
 2003 "Kabale og Kærlighed", Det Kgl. Teater
 2004 "Flugt", Det Kgl. Teater
 2005 "Demokrati", Betty Nansen Teatret
 2006 "Havfruen", Kaleidoskop og Cirkus Cirkör
 2007 "Nick Cave Teaterkoncerten", Aarhus Teater
 2008 "Et Drømmespil", Betty Nansen Teatret
 2009 "Breaking the Waves", Odense Teater
 2010 "Richard III" på Det Kgl. Teater
 2011 "Den unge Werthers lidelser", Det Kgl. Teater
 2012 "Mågen", Det Kongelige Teater
 2013 "Skakten", Aarhus Teater og CaféTeatret
 2014 "Metamorfoser", Det Kongelige Teater
 2015 "Beton", Aalborg Teater
 2016 "Lad den Rette komme ind", Odense Teater

Reumert for Best Actress 
 1999 Tammi Øst for "Aske til Aske – Støv til Støv", Husets Teater
 2000 Kirsten Olesen for "Sælsomt Mellemspil", Det Kongelige Teater
 2001  for "Så enkel er kærligheden", Rialto Teatret
 2002 Trine Dyrholm for "4:48 Psykose", Betty Nansen Teatret/ Edison
 2003  for "Fra regnormenes liv", Det Danske Teater
 2004  for "Dødsdansen", Betty Nansen Teatret/Edison
 2005  for "Anna Karenina", Aalborg Teater
 2006  for "Den Kaukasiske Kridtcirkel", Det Kongelige Teater
 2007  for "Pietà", Husets Teater, and "Håndbog i overlevelse", Teater Grob
 2008 Sofie Gråbøl for "Et drømmespil", Betty Nansen Teatret
 2009 Tammi Øst for "Ansigtet mod væggen", Holland House and Café Teatret and "Stuk", Det Kongelige Teater
 2010  for "Bygmester Solness", Det Kongelige Teater
 2011  for "Marguerite Viby – en pige med pep", Off/Off Production, and "Hitler on the Roof", Leman & Rosenbaum
 2012 Kirsten Olesen for "Gengangere", Det Kongelige Teater
 2013 Tammi Øst for "Kirsebærhaven", Aalborg Teater
 2014  for "Indenfor murene", Aalborg Teater
 2015  for "Det der er", Husets Teater
 2016 Benedikte Hansen for "Tørst", performed on the Abelone Koppel

Reumert for Best Actor 
 1999  "Personkreds 3", Edison, Betty Nansen Teatret
 2000 Søren Pilmark, "København", Betty Nansen Teatret
 2001 , "The Phantom of the Opera”
 2002 Nikolaj Lie Kaas "Peer Gynt”
 2003 Jesper Langberg, "Festen", Mammutteatret
 2004 Gyrd Løfqvist for "Gæsten", Teatret ved Sorte Hest
 2005 Henning Jensen, "Pinocchios Aske", Det Kongelige Teater
 2006 Jørgen Reenberg, "Indenfor murene", Det Kongelige Teater
 2007 Nicolas Bro for "Faust", Det Kongelige Teater
 2008 Nicolas Bro, "Hamlet", Det Kongelige Teater
 2009 Jens Albinus, "Stuk", Det Kongelige Teater
 2010 Søren Sætter-Lassen for "Richard III", Det Kongelige Teater
 2011  for "Udslet Hornsleth", Teater V
 2012 Jens Albinus for "Jeppe på Bjerget", Aarhus Teater
 2013 Ole Lemmeke for "Bang og Betty", Folketeatret
 2014 Søren Sætter-Lassen, for "Faderen", Det Kongelige Teater
 2015 Olaf Johannessen for "Samtale før døden", Betty Nansen Teatret, "Mefisto", Betty Nansen Teatret og "Heksejagt", Det Kongelige Teater
 2016 Olaf Johannessen for "Puntila", Det Kongelige Teater

Reumert Talent Award

2014 
 Benita Bünger, dancer, for her performance in Come Fly Away, Den Kongelige Ballet.

2016 
 Franciska Zahle, scenographer, for her scenography for Melodien der blev væk på Nørrebro Teater.
 , actor, for his performance in Lad den rette komme ind and Brødrene Løvehjerte on Odense Teater.
 Liv Helm, instruktør, for her iscenesættelse af Salamimetoden på Aarhus Teater, and Og nu: verden! på Husets Teater.
 Marie Knudsen Fogh, actor, for her performance in Richard III and Daemon on Aalborg Teater.
 Morten Grove Frandsen, singer, for his performance in Leaves, Sort/Hvid and Copenhagen Opera Festival.
 Nanna Rossen, singer, for his performance in Hairspray, Tivoli and Thomas Langkjær Entertainment.
 Simon Sears, actor, for his performance in Sidst på dagen er vi alle mennesker on Mammutteatret.
 Tobias Praetorius, dancer, for his performance in Short Time Together, Den Kongelige Ballet.

References 

1998 establishments in Denmark
Danish awards
Theatre awards